Dionysius Petrakis  was a Greek monk and politician. Petrakis took part in the Greek Revolution of 1821, and was a member of the first National Assembly of Epidaurus.

19th-century Greek people
Greek people of the Greek War of Independence
19th-century Greek politicians
Politicians from Athens
Clergy from Athens